Felix Onyedika Ogbuke (born 18 September 1985) is a Nigerian footballer who plays as a striker for Vietnamese club QNK Quảng Nam.

Felix Ogbuke in Israel :-Ms-Ashdod -12goals[assist countless 
Hapoel tel-aviv-4goals[assist countless 
Maccabi petach tikva-7goals [assist 15
captained the under 23 national team 2006/2007"
member of the Nigerian Super Eagle 2008/2009

External links

1985 births
Living people
Footballers from Enugu
Nigerian footballers
Nigerian expatriate footballers
Association football forwards
Al-Wasl F.C. players
F.C. Ashdod players
Hapoel Tel Aviv F.C. players
Maccabi Petah Tikva F.C. players
Hapoel Ramat Gan F.C. players
Apollon Limassol FC players
Legia Warsaw players
Hoang Anh Gia Lai FC players
Dhofar Club players
Israeli Premier League players
Liga Leumit players
Cypriot First Division players
Ekstraklasa players
V.League 1 players
Oman Professional League players
Expatriate footballers in the United Arab Emirates
Nigerian expatriate sportspeople in the United Arab Emirates
Expatriate footballers in Israel
Nigerian expatriate sportspeople in Israel
Expatriate footballers in Cyprus
Nigerian expatriate sportspeople in Cyprus
Expatriate footballers in Poland
Nigerian expatriate sportspeople in Poland
Expatriate footballers in Vietnam
Nigerian expatriate sportspeople in Vietnam
Expatriate footballers in Oman
Nigerian expatriate sportspeople in Oman